The Imperial German Army  Zeppelin LZ 80 (L-35) was a R-class World War I zeppelin.

Operational history 
The airship took part in 13 reconnaissance missions around the North and Baltic Sea; three attacks on England dropping  of bombs. The designers tried to make LZ 80 (L-35) more efficient by removing one engine making the airship  lighter.

Siemens torpedo glider testing   

The last test flight of the Siemens torpedo glider was performed on August 2, 1918. On this flight a  biplane glider was launched from Zeppelin LZ 80 (L 35).

Specifications (LZ 80 / Type R zeppelin)

See also

List of Zeppelins

Bibliography 
Notes

'References

 - Total pages: 320
  
 - Total pages: 48 

Airships of Germany
Hydrogen airships
Zeppelins